The 2022 Hawkers European Talent Cup (HETC)  is a one-make European motorcycle racing series with the express purpose of fostering junior riding talent with competitors required to be between 13 and 17 years old, and paving the way for such riders to progress their careers.

The HETC is one of a number  of such one-make series for young riders. Other such series include: Northern Talent Cup, British Talent Cup, Asia Talent Cup, and 2022 North America Talent Cup.

Calendar 
The calendar was published in November 2021. The Jerez and second Valencia rounds were advanced to July and October.

Championship standings

Riders' championship

References

European Talent Cup
European Talent Cup